Tony Cook may refer to:

 Tony Cook (rugby union), English rugby union player
 Tony Cook (athlete) (born 1936), Australian Olympic marathon runner
 Tony Cook (musician), dance music producer and former drummer for James Brown
 Tony Cook (footballer, born 1929) (1929–1996), English football goalkeeper
 Tony Cook (footballer, born 1976), English football midfielder

See also 
 Anthony Cook (disambiguation)